The Good Wife is a legal drama television series created by Robert King and Michelle King, which premiered on CBS on September 22, 2009.  The show tells the story of Alicia Florrick (Julianna Margulies), whose husband Peter (Chris Noth) has been jailed following a very public sex and corruption scandal. She returns to her old job as a defense attorney under Will Gardner and Diane Lockhart (Josh Charles and Christine Baranski) to rebuild her reputation and provide for her two children, Grace and Zach (Makenzie Vega and Graham Phillips). 

From the first to the fourth season, all episode titles have the same number of words as the number of the season in which they appear; that is, all season one episodes have one-word titles, all season two episodes have two-word titles, etc. Starting with the fifth season, the number of words starts to decrease; the idea of the creators was that – ratings permitting – the show would run for seven seasons, which would allow for a symmetry in the title lengths: 1–2–3–4–3–2–1 to count words in each season's titles, respectively.

On May 11, 2015, CBS renewed the series for a seventh season. It was announced in a commercial that aired during Super Bowl 50 that the seventh season would be the final season of The Good Wife.

Series overview

Episodes

Season 1 (2009–10)

Season 2 (2010–11)

Season 3 (2011–12)

Season 4 (2012–13)

Season 5 (2013–14)

Season 6 (2014–15)

Season 7 (2015–16)

Home video releases

References

External links
 
 

Good Wife